Michael George Appleby is a politician, cannabis activist, LGBT rights activist, and lawyer based in Wellington, New Zealand.

Background
Appleby is a human rights lawyer with a B.A. in politics and English, and an M.A. in Administrative Law, Taxation and Trusts, and Constitutional Law. He has taught law at various universities around New Zealand and Australia.

Political career
In addition to his legal career, Appleby was the leader of the Aotearoa Legalise Cannabis Party (ALCP) from its foundation in 1996 until 2013. This small political party is dedicated to the relaxation or repeal of laws against the use of cannabis and has never been represented in Parliament. In 1998 he was elected a member of the Terawhiti Licensing Trust as an ALCP candidate.

Appleby has stood as his party's candidate in the  electorate since its inception in 1996. His best result was in the 1999 election where he gained third place, aided by the fact that most major candidates had pulled out to support either incumbent Richard Prebble or challenger Marian Hobbs. He came fifth in the 2011 election. He later represented the Aotearoa Legalise Cannabis Party in the 2013 Ikaroa-Rāwhiti by-election.

Appleby stood unsuccessfully for the Wellington City Council in October 2004. He ran again for the Wellington City Council in the October 2013 local government elections, where he placed ninth in the Lambton Ward and was not elected.

During the 2020 New Zealand general election, Appleby contested Wellington Central for the Aotearoa Legalise Cannabis Party, gaining 240 votes.

References

External links
 Candidate profile for the 2013 Wellington City Council election 
 Candidate profile on vote.co.nz for the 2013 Wellington City Council election

Year of birth missing (living people)
Living people
20th-century New Zealand lawyers
21st-century New Zealand lawyers
21st-century New Zealand politicians
Leaders of political parties in New Zealand
Aotearoa Legalise Cannabis Party politicians
Cannabis political party politicians
New Zealand LGBT rights activists
Unsuccessful candidates in the 1996 New Zealand general election
Unsuccessful candidates in the 1999 New Zealand general election
Unsuccessful candidates in the 2002 New Zealand general election
Unsuccessful candidates in the 2005 New Zealand general election
Unsuccessful candidates in the 2008 New Zealand general election
Unsuccessful candidates in the 2011 New Zealand general election
Unsuccessful candidates in the 2020 New Zealand general election